The EU Digital COVID Certificate (EUDCC), known in Italy as the Green Pass, and in France as the Sanitary Pass or Health Pass (passe sanitaire), is a digital certificate that a person has been vaccinated against COVID-19, tested for infection with SARS-CoV-2, or recovered from COVID-19 created by the European Union (EU) and valid in all member states.

The EU Digital COVID Certificate was created to facilitate travel within the European Union. It launched in July 2021, and is available to citizens of the EU, and also to travellers from outside of the region. By December 2022, the member states had issued more than 2 billion EU Digital COVID Certificates.

With 51 non-EU countries and territories connected to the system in addition to the 27 member states, the EU Digital COVID Certificate is a global standard for COVID-19 certification.

While in March 2022, 17 member states were still requiring travellers to be in the possession of an EU Digital COVID Certificate, this number dropped to 7 member mtates in May 2022, and eventually to 0 member states in August 2022.

On 11 October 2022 Janine Small, Pfizer's president of international developed markets, admitted before the European Parliament in Brussels that, during the development of the vaccine, no transmission tests were carried out before it was placed on the market. The MEP who asked the question, Robert Roos, later stated on his Twitter account that "the legal basis of the green pass has been broken down [by these statements]".

Information in the certificate
The EUDCC certifies that a person has either:
 COVID-19 vaccination
 received a negative COVID-19 test result
 recovered from COVID-19

Additionally, the certificate contains the full name and date of birth of the certificate holder. No other personal information is included.

Each certificate only certifies one claim, so for each vaccination and each test a separate certificate is required.

Implementation
The EUDCC is a digitally-signed document. It is usually supplied in the form of a QR code, either contained in a PDF file, or as a printout. There are various mobile apps available to store and display the EUDCC (such as the Corona-Warn-App); alternatively, the EUDCC can be presented on paper.

To check the validity of the EUDCC, a special software is required which scans the QR code and verifies the digital signature, for example the mobile application CovPassCheck-App.

Technically, the QR code contains JSON document with the information payload. This JSON document is serialized using Concise Binary Object Representation (CBOR), and digitally signed according to CBOR Object Signing and Encryption (COSE). The resulting data is compressed with zlib and encoded into the final QR code.

Non-EU countries

References 

Passports
Schengen Area